Mikhaylovka or Mikhailovka may refer to:

Armenia
Mikhailovka, alternative spelling of Mikhayelovka, a town in Lori Province
Mikhaylovka, former name of Chambarak, a town in Gegharkunik Province
Mikhaylovka, former name of Hankavan, a village in Kotayk Province

Azerbaijan
Mixaylovka (Mikhaylovka), a village in Goygol District
Mikhaylovka, alternative name of Niyazoba, a village in Khachmaz District

Kyrgyzstan
Mikhaylovka, Issyk Kul, a village in Issyk-Kul Region
Mikhaylovka, Jalal-Abad, a village in Jalal-Abad Region

Russia
Mikhaylovka, Russia, several inhabited localities

Ukraine
Mykhailivka, Chernivtsi Raion, Chernivtsi Oblast, a village in Chernivtsi Oblast
Mikhaylivka, Vinnytsia Oblast (Mikhaylovka), a village in Vinnytsia Oblast
Mikhaylovka culture (3600—3000 BCE)

See also
Michael (disambiguation)
Mikhaylov (disambiguation)
Mikhaylovsk
Mikhaylovsky (disambiguation)